Lee Ji-hoon (born 9 April 1989) in Suwon) is a South Korean ice sledge hockey player. He was part of the Korean team that won a bronze medal at the 2018 Winter Paralympics.

He lost his legs following an accident when he was 21.

References

External links 
 

1989 births
Living people
South Korean sledge hockey players
Paralympic bronze medalists for South Korea
Paralympic sledge hockey players of South Korea
Para ice hockey players at the 2018 Winter Paralympics
Medalists at the 2018 Winter Paralympics
People from Suwon
Paralympic medalists in sledge hockey
Sportspeople from Gyeonggi Province